La soberana is a Venezuelan drama telenovela created by Xiomara Moreno, based on the Spain novel La Regenta written by Leopoldo Alas y Ureña. It stars Eileen Abad, Albi De Abreu, and Nacho Huett. It is distributed by RCTV International and Coral Pictures. The series tells the story of Ana and Álvaro, two young people who will face the toughest adversities to fight for the immense love they have had since they were children.

Plot 
The Andean town of Vetusta is a hive of gossip and hypocrisy that Ana Ozores will come to know very well. Cradled in poverty despite being the daughter of the powerful Emiliano Ozores, Ana is collected by her paternal aunts, Águeda and Rosa Ozores. Although Ana is the apparent heir of the family fortune, her aunts, especially Águeda, humiliate her by reminding her of being a bastard. Ana seeks solace in a romance with Álvaro Mesías, but when he goes to study far, Ana's life with her aunts becomes intolerable. Don Víctor Quintana, Vetusta's most powerful man, asks for Ana's hand and she accepts it, happy to be able to flee her home. However, his marriage life will be a martyrdom, aggravated by the return of Álvaro; When he learns of Anna's betrayal, he vows revenge. Ana finds a way to prevent Víctor from compelling her to fulfill her conjugal duties, but still, she must remain with him. To top it all two problems arise in his life: Vetusta arrives at the seminarian Angel, an alleged stepbrother of Ana, who comes to dispute the inheritance of his father. Likewise, Chery Benavides, a woman of the world who is interested in Álvaro, also arrives.

Cast

Main 

 Eileen Abad as Ana Ozores
 Albi De Abreu as Álvaro Mesías
 Nacho Huett as Ángel Ozores

 Flor Núñez as Águeda Ozores
 Roberto Moll as Don Víctor Quintana
 Alicia Plaza as Rosa Ozores
 Luis Gerardo Núñez as Ramón Linares
 Marlene De Andrade as Pura Benavides de Linares
 Eliana López as Felipa Linares
 Ámbar Díaz as Teresa Mesías
 Miguel Ferrari as Benedicto
 Flor Elena González as Dulce de Mesías
 Juan Carlos Gardié as Eleazar Mesías
 Marcos Moreno as Rufino
 Jenny Noguera as Eusebia Gómez
 Joel Borges as Jaime Ríos
 Leonardo Marrero as Hermes
 Rodolfo Renwick as Doctor Dange
 Elisa Stella as Inginia Domínguez

Recurring 
 Javier Paredes as López
 Gabriela Santeliz as Mirna
 Francis Romero as Señora Mijares
 Vito Lonardo as Padre Rómulo
 Gerardo Soto as El Barbero
 Hernán Mejía as Lorenzo

Special guest stars 
 Daniela Bascopé as Chery Benavides
 Carlos Guillermo Haydon as Pancho Pepe Benavides
 Juliet Lima as Petra

Production 
The telenovela is set in Venezuela in the 1950s. The outdoor production began in February, when they moved to San Pablo del Río in Táchira state, to record the first episodes of the telenovela. There were also days in Mérida and several nearby towns of Caracas, where the architecture was lent to settle a town of time these replaced the Andean for the following chapters.

References

External links 
 

2001 telenovelas
Spanish-language telenovelas
Venezuelan telenovelas
RCTV telenovelas
2001 Venezuelan television series debuts
2001 Venezuelan television series endings
Television shows set in Venezuela